Fridolf Jansson  (25 May 1904–7 June 1991) was a Swedish politician. He was a member of the Centre Party.

References
This article was initially translated from the Swedish Wikipedia article.

Centre Party (Sweden) politicians
1904 births
Year of death missing
Members of the Första kammaren
20th-century Swedish politicians